Sverige–Sovjet was a television entertainment programme. It aired lived over SVT between 2 November-21 December 1996.

Guests
 Candela
 Phil Collins
 James Hetfield
 Anni-Frid Lyngstad

References

External links
The programme at SVT's open archive 

Sveriges Television original programming
1996 Swedish television series debuts
1996 Swedish television series endings